Örlygsson may refer to:

Gunnar Örn Örlygsson (born 1971), former Icelandic politician, former basketball player
Örlygur Hnefill Örlygsson (born 1983), (Orly Orlyson), Icelandic filmmaker, hotelier, founder of The Exploration Museum
Ormarr Örlygsson (born 1962), Icelandic former footballer
Teitur Örlygsson (born 1967), Icelandic former professional basketball player and coach
Þorvaldur Örlygsson (born 1966), Icelandic former footballer

See also
Þorláksson
Olsson